Ignacio Garriga Vaz de Concicao (born 4 February 1987) is a Spanish politician as well as a former dentist and professor. He is known in the Spanish media for being the first notable Afro-Spaniard elected politician within the Vox party. In October 2022 he became Secretary General of Vox.

Personal life
Garriga was born in Sant Cugat del Vallès to a Catalan father named Rafael of maternal Belgian descent and an Equatoguinean mother named Clotilde. His mother is also of Portuguese descent through her father. Clotilde's parents, Mercedes and Pablo, owned a supermarket in Malabo, but after the death of Pablo, Mercedes sent Clotilde and her seven brothers to live in Barcelona. His father, Rafael Garriga Kuijpers, comes from a political family where both his father and brother (Ignacio's grandfather and uncle) were both involved in nationalist organizations. Garriga's cousin is Juan Garriga Domenech who has also since become active in Vox.

Garriga is one of five children and grew up speaking Catalan as his first language. He considers himself 100% Spanish. Before becoming a politician Garriga worked as a dentist. He is married and has one daughter and three sons. He has worked as a professor at the Faculty of Dentistry of the International University of Catalonia.

Political career
Garriga was previously a member of the People's Party, but left in 2010 after disagreements on the party's stance on gay marriage, abortion, Spanish unity, and immigration.

Garriga joined Vox in 2014. Due to being the only black politician in the party he is sometimes described as the "Black Catalan of Vox" although Garriga rejects this label, arguing that he is Spanish, and that the name is racist. He supports mandatory deportation of illegal immigrants. Garriga has stated that Vox is Christian humanist, and the most accepting political party in Spain. Garriga identifies as Catalan but is strongly opposed to the Catalan independence movement.

Garriga was elected to the 13th Congress of Deputies in the April 2019 Spanish general election. He was re-elected to the 14th Congress of Deputies in the November 2019 Spanish general election. In 2020, he resigned his seat in the Congress after becoming a representative in the Catalan Parliament and was replaced by Carlos Segura.

He is the leader of Vox in Barcelona. In October 2022 he was promoted to secretary general of Vox.

See also
Bertrand Ndongo, Vox member born in Cameroon

References

1987 births
Living people
Politicians from Catalonia
Vox (political party) politicians
Spanish people of Equatoguinean descent
Spanish people of Belgian descent
Spanish people of Portuguese descent
People from Sant Cugat del Vallès
Politicians from Barcelona
Spanish dentists
Far-right politics in Catalonia
Members of the 13th Congress of Deputies (Spain)
Members of the 14th Congress of Deputies (Spain)